Wyeomyia is a genus of mosquitoes first described in 1901 by Frederick Vincent Theobald.  The genus's 140 species can be difficult to characterize because of their diversity and the need for additional taxonomic work to further delineate them. Adults resemble genus Limatus and Sabethes  mosquitoes more closely than other genera in the New World tribe Sabethini, but differ by their scutal scales ranging in color from a relatively dull bronzy with a slight metallic sheen in most species, to a metallic gold.  There are other distinguishing characters as well.

Distribution

Wyeomyia mosquitoes are predominantly neotropical, ranging across the Caribbean into Florida, with one species occurring in eastern North America.

Ecology

Most Wyeomyia mosquitoes are forest-inhabiting, preferring damp environments.  Larvae develop in small collections of water in bromeliads and aroids, flower bracts, broken bamboo and bamboo stumps, tree holes, pitcher plants, and sometimes man-made containers.  They feed on organic matter in the water, including decomposing carcasses of insects and spiders.  Some species obtain oxygen directly from the water, rarely, if ever, surfacing.

Adults are active during the day, usually near larval habitats. Some species are found at characteristic elevations in the forest canopy, with others appearing to be restricted to ground level.

Most Wyeomyia species will take blood meals, and females readily feed on humans who enter their habitat. Although Ilhéus, Venezuelan equine encephalitis and Maguari viruses have been isolated from Wyeomyia mosquitoes, they are not known to transmit a disease agent to humans.

Subgenera
The following subgenera are recognised:

Antunesmyia Lane & Cerqueira, 1942
Caenomyiella Harbach & Peyton, 1990
Cruzmyia Lane & Cerqueira, 1942
Decamyia Dyar, 1919
Dendromyia Theobald, 1903
Dodecamyia Dyar, 1918
Exallomyia Harbach & Peyton, 1992
Hystatomyia Dyar, 1919
Menolepis Lutz, 1905
Miamyia Dyar, 1919
Nunezia Dyar, 1928
Phoniomyia Theobald, 1903
Prosopolepis Lutz, 1905
Spilonympha Motta & Lourenço-de-Oliveira, 2005
Triamyia Dyar, 1919
Wyeomyia Theobald, 1901
Zinzala Zavortink, 1986

See also
 List of Wyeomyia species

References

Culicinae
Mosquito genera
Taxa named by Frederick Vincent Theobald